Lee Min-ki (born 19 May 1993) is a South Korean footballer who plays as a defender for Gwangju FC in the K League 1.

References

External links 
 

1993 births
South Korean footballers
Association football defenders
Living people
Gwangju FC players
Gimcheon Sangmu FC players
K League 1 players
K League 2 players